Luigi Snozzi (29 July 1932 – 29 December 2020) was a Swiss architect, born in Mendrisio, Ticino. He worked in Locarno and Lugano.

Life
He studied at the Swiss Federal Institute of Technology in Zurich. From 1962 to 1971, Snozzi worked in association with architect Livio Vacchini.  From 1982 to 1984, he was a Visiting Professor and in 1985 he was appointed Professor of Architecture at École Polytechnique Fédérale de Lausanne.  Snozzi was a professor of the University of Sassari, at the Faculty of Architecture of Alghero, Sardinia.

Snozzi died in Minusio on 29 December 2020, at the age of 88, after contracting COVID-19 during the COVID-19 pandemic in Switzerland.

References

1932 births
2020 deaths
Architects from Ticino
Swiss people of Italian descent
Academic staff of the École Polytechnique Fédérale de Lausanne
Architecture educators
École Polytechnique Fédérale de Lausanne alumni
Members of the Academy of Arts, Berlin
People from Mendrisio
20th-century Swiss architects
Deaths from the COVID-19 pandemic in Switzerland
21st-century Swiss architects